{{Speciesbox
| image = E mei zhi wu tu zhi (1945) (20666698263).jpg
| image_caption = From Institute of Botany, Chinese Academy of Sciences
| genus = Lithocarpus
| species = elegans
| authority = (Blume) Hatus. ex Soepadmo
| synonyms = 
 Arcaula spicata 
 Lithocarpus collettii 
 Lithocarpus finetii 
 Lithocarpus gracilipes 
 Lithocarpus grandifolius 
 Lithocarpus intermedius 
 Lithocarpus microcalyx 
 Lithocarpus rhioensis 
 Lithocarpus spicatus 
 Pasania finetii 
 Pasania mixta 
 Pasania placentaria 
 Pasania pseudomolucca 
 Pasania spicata 
 Quercus anceps 
 Quercus elegans 
 Quercus elegans 
 Quercus glaberrima 
 Quercus gracilipes 
 Quercus grandifolia 
 Quercus microcalyx 
 Quercus mixta 
 Quercus placentaria 
 Quercus pseudomolucca 
 Quercus rhioensis 
 Quercus sphacelata 
 Quercus squamata 
 Synaedrys pseudomolucca 
 Synaedrys spicata 
| synonyms_ref = 
}}Lithocarpus elegans is a tree in the beech family Fagaceae. The specific epithet  is from the Latin meaning "elegant", referring to the acorns and cupules.

The greyish brown bark is fissured or lenticellate.

Distribution and habitatLithocarpus elegans'' grows naturally in the Indian subcontinent, Indo-China and Malesia. Its habitat is dipterocarp to lower montane forests up to  altitude.

Uses
The timber is used locally as firewood and for charcoal.

References

elegans
Trees of the Indian subcontinent
Trees of Indo-China
Trees of Malesia
Plants described in 1825